A by-election for the seat of Uralla-Walcha in the New South Wales Legislative Assembly was held on 9 June 1900 because of the resignation of William Piddington, ostensibly for private reasons and was a candidate for re-election. It would appear that Piddington resigned due to insolvency as he was made bankrupt on his own petition on 25 May 1900.

The by-election for Canterbury was held on the same day.

Dates

Result

William Piddington resigned.

Aftermath
While William Piddington was re-elected, he died on 27 September 1900, resulting in a further by-election, where the seat was retained by the Protectionist party.

See also
Electoral results for the district of Uralla-Walcha
List of New South Wales state by-elections

References

1900 elections in Australia
New South Wales state by-elections
1900s in New South Wales